Vaughan Glaser (November 17, 1872 – November 23, 1958) was an American stage and film actor. His stage career started a long time before the First World War; he often appeared opposite Fay Courteney in the 1910s. He appeared in numerous Broadway productions between 1902 and 1945. Glaser made his film debut in 1939 as the high-school principal Bradley in What a Life (1939), a role which he had already played in the Broadway play of the same name.

Glaser continued his role during the 1940s as Mr. Bradley in the Henry Aldrich film series, which was based on What a Life. The character actor is also notable for his appearance as the blind and wise uncle of Priscilla Lane in Alfred Hitchcock's thriller Saboteur. He also portrayed supporting roles in the Frank Capra movies Meet John Doe and Arsenic and Old Lace. Glaser retired from film business after 21 films in five years.

Filmography

References

External links 
 

1872 births
1958 deaths
American male film actors
American male stage actors
20th-century American male actors